Abdulwahid Ahmad Hassan AlAbduljabbar was a Saudi political activist. Born in 1935 in Qatif, died June 15, 1970, of torture in the garden of the prison in Jeddah by Saudi authorities. He was arrested on June 4, 1970, with Abdulwahid Faraj AlOmran, both were murdered on the night of June 15, 1970, and both were buried in a ditch the prison's garden. The charge against him by the Saudi-Pakistani colonel was of if there was any relations to, and whether the failed coup was a front for George Habash, Nayef Hawatmeh, Mohsen Ibrahim, Nasser AlSaeed and the Union of the People of the Arabian Peninsula, all Socialist personalities and organizations. The annual report of the International Committee for the Defense of Human Rights in the Gulf and the Arabian Peninsula in 1989 mentioned him getting arrested and after 11 days of torture he died of severe hemorrhage leaving behind a wife and one son named Khalid.

Sources

See also 

Freedom of religion in Saudi Arabia

Saudi Arabian murder victims
People murdered in Saudi Arabia
1935 births
1970 deaths
Saudi Arabian people of Bahraini descent
Saudi Arabian people who died in prison custody
Prisoners who died in Saudi Arabian detention
Saudi Arabian activists
Saudi Arabian torture victims
1970s murders in Saudi Arabia